Jim Millnder is a retired American soccer player and coach who played professionally in the North American Soccer League and Major Indoor Soccer League, American Soccer League and United Soccer League.  He coached collegiate soccer for twenty-nine years.

Player
Millinder graduated from North Torrance High School.  He then played soccer at El Camino College where he was a 1977 Junior College All American. He was inducted into the El Camino Athletic Hall of Fame in 1992.  In 1978, he turned professional with the New York Cosmos of the North American Soccer League.  He saw no first team games and in 1978, he moved to the Los Angeles Aztecs.  He played four games for the Aztecs then was sent to the Tulsa Roughnecks for the 1979–1980 NASL indoor season.  In June 1980, the Roughnecks sent Millinder and cash to the Fort Lauderdale Strikers in exchange for David Irving.  He played no games for the Strikers before being released.  In 1982, he joined the Oklahoma City Slickers of the American Soccer League.  He was a 1983 ASL All Star with the Slickers.  That fall, he signed with the Los Angeles Lazers of the Major Indoor Soccer League.  He spent two indoor seasons with the Lazers.  In 1984, he spent the summer with the Oklahoma City Stampede of the United Soccer League.  In 1985, he played for the Tulsa Tornados.  In 1990, he briefly played for the San Diego Nomads of the American Professional Soccer League.

In 1976, Millinder played for the United States U-20 men's national soccer team during its unsuccessful qualification campaign for the 1977 FIFA World Youth Championship.

Coach
In 1978, Millinder became an assistant coach to both the men's and women's soccer teams at El Camino College.  In 1987, he was the interim head coach of the men's team as it won the California Junior College State Championship. In 1990, he was elevated to the position of head coach of the women's team and took the team to the 1990 California Junior College State Championship.  He finished his tenure with a 66–8–16 record.  He also coached the men's team during the 1992 and 1993 seasons to a 43–9–17 record.  In 1994, Millinder became the head coach at Loyola Marymount University.  He compiled am 8–27–4 record over two seasons.  In May 1996, the University of Southern California hired Millinder as the head coach of the women's soccer team.  On November 16, 2006, the university announced it would not renew Millinder's contract. He had compiled a 136–70–21 record, but had never taken a team past the second round of the NCAA post-season tournament.  Millender became head coach of the University of San Francisco in 2012.

Millinder has also coached numerous amateur teams including Ajax, the 1992 U.S. Women's Amateur National Champion.

References

External links
 NASL stats
 USC: Jim Millinder

1958 births
Living people
Sportspeople from Salina, Kansas
American soccer coaches
American soccer players
El Camino College alumni
American Soccer League (1933–1983) players
American Professional Soccer League players
Fort Lauderdale Strikers (1977–1983) players
Los Angeles Aztecs players
Los Angeles Lazers players
North American Soccer League (1968–1984) indoor players
Loyola Marymount Lions men's soccer coaches
College women's soccer coaches in the United States
New York Cosmos players
North American Soccer League (1968–1984) players
Oklahoma City Slickers (ASL) players
Oklahoma City Stampede players
Nomads Soccer Club players
Soccer players from Kansas
Tulsa Roughnecks (1978–1984) players
Tulsa Tornados players
United Soccer League (1984–85) players
United States men's under-20 international soccer players
San Francisco Dons women's soccer coaches
USC Trojans women's soccer coaches
Loyola Marymount Lions women's soccer coaches
Association football midfielders
Association football defenders